Lusatian may refer to:
 Lusatian languages (Sorbian languages)
 Lusatians (people) (Sorbs)
 Lusatia (Sorbia)
 Lusatian culture, of the later Bronze Age and early Iron Age

See also
Lusatian Serbian (disambiguation), another synonym for Sorb

Language and nationality disambiguation pages